Cremastocheilus crinitus is a species of scarab beetle in the family Scarabaeidae.

Subspecies
These three subspecies belong to the species Cremastocheilus crinitus:
 Cremastocheilus crinitus bifoveatus Van Dyke, 1918
 Cremastocheilus crinitus crinitus LeConte, 1874
 Cremastocheilus crinitus pugetanus Casey, 1915

References

Further reading

 

Cetoniinae
Articles created by Qbugbot
Beetles described in 1874